Omer Kaleshi (1932 – 17 April 2022) was a Macedonian painter of Albanian descent from Srbica village, Kičevo of North Macedonia. He began as a visual artist in Istanbul, Turkey, and lived in Paris, France. He was noted for his epic paintings of ancient Albanian people.

Artistic life 
 1956 - After many exhibitions and professional experiences all over the art galleries of famous capitals and cities of Istanbul, Rome, Vienna, London, Belgrade or The Hague the painter Kaleshi decided to stay and create in Paris.
 2013 - Kaleshi is part of the study by the art critic Luan Rama who made as a quartet of living painters in France with the other Albanian painters like Zamir Mati, Bujar Luca and Artur Muharremi.

In 2012, Kaleshi was honored by the Iliria Royal University with the title of “Honorary Member of the Board of the ILIRIA College”. With the reception of this award, Kaleshi joined a list of illustrious recipients, which includes personalities like the Leka, Crown Prince of Albania, Arberesh Aleksandar, and Ferid Murad, whose contributions to medical sciences won him the Nobel Prize in Physiology or Medicine in 1998.

See also 
Modern Albanian art

References 
list of articles at Albanian Library Bksh.al
Mymemory.translated.net
Oxfordreference.com

External links 
Uiliria.org
Lajme Tetova
Idividi.com.mk

1932 births
2022 deaths
Albanians in North Macedonia
20th-century Macedonian painters
Albanian painters
People from Kičevo
21st-century Macedonian painters
20th-century male artists
21st-century male artists